Herbert Heinrich (29 July 1899, in Leipzig – 2 March 1975, in Düsseldorf) was a German swimmer who competed in the 1928 Summer Olympics. Heinrich was considered the preeminent short distance German swimmer of the early 1920s, but because German athletes had been excluded from the Olympic Games in 1920 and 1924, prior to 1928, Heinrich was only able to compete internationally at the European Swimming Championships, first held in 1926 in Budapest.

References

1899 births
1975 deaths
German male freestyle swimmers
Olympic swimmers of Germany
Swimmers at the 1928 Summer Olympics
Swimmers from Leipzig
European Aquatics Championships medalists in swimming
19th-century German people
20th-century German people